Evgeny Mityakin (born 24 December 1997) is a Russian professional ice hockey player. He is currently playing within HC Neftekhimik Nizhnekamsk of the Kontinental Hockey League (KHL).

Playing career
On 10 January 2015, Mityakin made his Kontinental Hockey League debut playing with Avtomobilist Yekaterinburg during the 2014–15 KHL season.

After spending his first seven professional seasons within Avtomobilist, Mityakin left the organization after he was traded to Neftekhimik Nizhnekamsk in exchange for the rights to Arsen Khisamutdinov on 1 May 2021.

References

External links

1997 births
Living people
Avtomobilist Yekaterinburg players
HC Neftekhimik Nizhnekamsk players
Russian ice hockey forwards